Barbara of Karniów (1445 – April 27, 1510) was the daughter of Nicholas V of Karniów and Margaret Clemm of Ellguth. In 1475 she married Jan IV of Oświęcim. Together they had  one daughter Helena (1478/80 – aft. 1524), married in 1492 to Baron George of Schellenberg

References

1445 births
1510 deaths